Nesrin Abdullah is a commander and spokesperson for the Kurdish militia group YPJ (Women's Protection Unit) in Syria. She has been active in communicating the progress of the Kurdish and Syrian Democratic Forces operation to liberate Raqqa from ISIS. She was born in Dirik in the town of Cizre.

She has been involved in the women's defense organization as early in 2011 and in April 2013 she announced the establishment of the YPJ. In 2015 she was part of a delegation of the YPG/J who met with French President Francois Hollande in Paris. She has also stated that she believes that Turkey was involved in the massacre of civilians in Kobanê in 2014 by ISIS. She made the statement while part of a Kurdish delegation that included PYD Co-President Salih Müslim and Kobanê Canton Administration Co-President Enver Müslim to Italy on 23 July 2015.

While in Italy in June 2015 she told the Italian newspaper Il Manifesto that, “we are militants; we are not paid to make war, we are partisans of revolution. We live with our people, follow a philosophy and have a political project... At the same time we are carrying out a gender struggle against the patriarchal system. Other combatants are our comrades; we have political and friendly relations.”

References

Kurdish female military and paramilitary personnel
Year of birth missing (living people)
Living people
Syrian women
Female military personnel
Kurdish people
Women in 21st-century warfare